The Restinga da Marombas is a restinga in the coast of the Brazilian state of Rio de Janeiro. It is 42 km long and separates Sepetiba Bay from the Atlantic Ocean, being a part of the municipalities of Rio de Janeiro, Itaguaí and Mangaratiba.

It is owned and run by the Brazilian army. It is used as a leisure ground for military staff and their friends and families, as well as for scientific research in the untouched Atlantic Rainforest found within the restinga.

It has been used as a setting for several telenovelas, including Kubanacan and Da Cor Do Pecado

Landforms of Rio de Janeiro (state)
Coasts of Brazil
Spits (landform)